The Sangam period or age, particularly referring to the third Sangam period, is the period of the history of ancient Tamil Nadu, Kerala and parts of Sri Lanka (then known as Tamilakam) dating back to c. 3rd century CE. It was named after the mythical and legendary Sangam academies of poets and scholars centered in the city of Madurai.

In Old Tamil language, the term Tamilakam (Tamiḻakam, Purananuru 168. 18) referred to the whole of the ancient Tamil-speaking area, corresponding roughly to the area known as southern India today, consisting of the territories of the present-day Indian states of Tamil Nadu, Kerala, parts of Andhra Pradesh, parts of Karnataka and northern Sri Lanka also known as Eelam.

History

According to Tamil legends, there were three Sangam periods, namely Head Sangam, Middle Sangam and Last Sangam period. Historians use the term Sangam period to refer the last of these, with the first two being legendary. It is also called the last Sangam period, or third Sangam period. 

The Sangam literature is thought to have been produced in three Sangam academies of each period. The evidence on the early history of the Tamil kingdoms consists of the epigraphs of the region, the Sangam literature, and archaeological data. The period between 600 BCE to 300 CE, Tamilakam was ruled by the three Tamil dynasties of Pandya, Chola and Chera, and a few independent chieftains, the Velir.

Literary sources

There is a wealth of sources detailing the history, socio-political environment and cultural practices of ancient Tamilakam, including volumes of literature and epigraphy.

Culture

The Sangam Tamils enjoyed a high degree of cultural life. Their interests in education, literature, music, dance, drama and festivals have been described in the Sangam literature.

Society

The fourfold Vedic system of caste hierarchy did not exist during Sangam period. The society was organized by occupational groups living apart from each other..

See also 

History of Tamil Nadu
Tolkappiyam
Purananuru
Paripaatal
List of Sangam poets

References

Bibliography

 A. L. Basham, The Wonder that was India, Picador (1995) 
 P. T. Srinivasa Iyengar, History of the Tamils from the earliest times to 600 AD, Madras, 1929; Chennai, Asian Educational Svcs. (2001) .

 
Ancient India
Tamil history
Ancient Tamil Nadu
4th-century disestablishments in India